The University of Souk Ahras Mohamed Chérif Messaadia (Arabic:جامعة سوق أهراس - محمد الشريف مساعدية ) is a university located in Souk Ahras, Algeria. It was founded in 1998 as an annex within the university of Annaba. In 2011, it was officially promoted to an accredited university with six faculties and two institutes.

References

External links
 University of Souk Ahras website 

Universities and colleges in Algeria